John Williams (May 29, 1922 – January 19, 1973) was an American Negro league first baseman in the 1940s.

A native of Jonesboro, Arkansas, Williams played for the Chicago American Giants in 1948. In 10 recorded games, he posted four hits in 34 plate appearances. Williams died in Fort Wayne, Indiana in 1973 at age 50.

References

External links
 and Seamheads

1922 births
1973 deaths
Chicago American Giants players
Baseball first basemen
Baseball players from Arkansas
People from Jonesboro, Arkansas
20th-century African-American sportspeople